Statistics of Czechoslovak First League in the 1959–60 season.

Overview
It was contested by 14 teams, and Spartak Hradec Králové won the championship. Michal Pucher was the league's top scorer with 18 goals.

Stadia and locations

League standings

Results

Top goalscorers

References

 Czechoslovakia - List of final tables (RSSSF)

Czechoslovak First League seasons
Czech
1959–60 in Czechoslovak football